Chutzpah is a Hebrew term for audacity or nerve.

Chutzpah may also refer to:

 ¡Chutzpah!, a 2009 album by The Wildhearts
 Chutzpah Magazine, a defunct Chinese literary magazine
 Chutzpah (web series) , a 2021 web series on SonlyLiv
 Chutzpah!, a 1991 book by Alan Dershowitz
 The Chutzpah or Lior Ben-David, an Israeli professional wrestler

See also
 Beyond Chutzpah, a 2005 book by Norman Finkelstein